Vanagas is a Lithuanian surname that may refer to
Benediktas Vanagas (born 1977), Lithuanian rally driver
Povilas Vanagas (born 1970), Lithuanian ice dancer
Adolfas Ramanauskas, nom de guerre Vanagas (1918–1957), one of the leaders of the Lithuanian resistance

Lithuanian-language surnames